The Pontifical Catholic University of Goiás (PUC-Goiás) is a private and non-profit Pontifical catholic university, located in Goiânia (headquarters) and Ipameri, is the first university of the State of Goiás. It is maintained by the Catholic Archdiocese of Goiânia.

Founded on October 19, 1961, by the Sociedade Goiana de Cultura, a non-profit foundation maintained by the Catholic Archdiocese of Goiânia, PUC Goiás is the oldest higher education institution of the state and of the Central-Western region, preceding by two months the foundation of UFG. According to INEP.

In 2009, Polish Cardinal Zenon Grocholewski, 69, prefect of the Congregation for Catholic Education of the Vatican visited the university. The visit is in honor of 50 years existence of the university. 

Renowned University of Pontifical Right, the UCG will be the seventh institution in Brazil with a similar title and 31st in the world. Five years ago the university began the process to become PUC, which will cause the institution now has an ecclesiastic bond not only with the local bishop, but also with the Vatican. Thus, all decisions must come from the pope, who appointed and qualified, including the Grand Chancellor and Provost of the institution. "The university, of course, gained international prestige," stresses the dean of the UCG, Wolmir Amado.

History
In 1948, Dom Emmanuel Gomes de Oliveira, then Archbishop of Goiânia, had the idea of creating the first university of the Central-Western Brazil. Later that year, the Philosophy College was launched as the first higher education institution of the region, offering degrees in history, geography, Portuguese, and teaching. The Colleges of Economics was founded in 1951, and Law in 1959, in addition to the higher education schools of Fine Arts (1952), Nursing (1954), Social Service (1957), and Social and Economic Studies.

In 1958, the Sociedade Goiana de Cultura was created to maintain these colleges and schools, which were gathered into the Universidade de Goiás, later renamed Universidade Católica de Goiás and recently recognized by the Holy See as a University of Pontifical Right, becoming PUC Goiás.

According to the latest results of the General Index of Courses uncovered by the National Institute of Studies and Research on Education (Instituto Nacional de Estudos e Pesquisas Educacionais - INEP), linked to the Ministry of Education, PUC Goiás is the second best university in the state of Goiás, behind only UFG and ahead of UEG.

Infrastructure
PUC Goiás has five campuses, four of them in Goiânia, the state capital, and another in the municipality of Ipameri. The university also has a library with over 213,000 books, a school of foreign languages, a local television network (PUC-TV), four research institutes, over 400 laboratories, two school-clinics and two museums.

Campuses
 Campus I - Setor Universitário, Goiânia 
 Area I: Rua 226, Rua 235, and 5ª Avenida 
 Area II: Praça Universitária, 1ª Avenida, and Rua 240 
 Area III: Praça Universitária, 1ª Avenida, and Av. Universitária 
 Area IV: Praça Universitária, 1ª Avenida, and Rua 235 
 Area V: Rua 232
 Campus II: Estrada Santa Rita, km 2, Jardim Olímpico, Goiânia 
 Campus III: Rua Colônia, Jardim Novo Mundo, Goiânia 
 Campus IV: Avenida Vereador José Benevenuto Filho, Setor Universitário, Ipameri 
 Campus V: Avenida  José Sebba, Jardim Goiás, Goiânia

References

External links
 Official website

Educational institutions established in 1959
1959 establishments in Brazil
Pontifical universities in Brazil